The Scarborough Board of Education (SBE, commonly known as School District 16), formally the Board of Education for the City of Scarborough is the former public-secular school district serving Scarborough, Ontario, Canada. The board was founded in 1954 through a merger of the Scarborough Collegiate and Township School Boards.

As of 1996, the SBE had served over 81,000 students and 8,300 employed staff. It was the largest school board in the former Metro Toronto.

In 1998, the SBE was merged into the Toronto District School Board. The former SBE offices in Borough Drive. remain in use today by the TDSB as the East Education Office.

History

Scarborough's first schools were built in Hough's Corners, West Hill, Woburn, L'Amoreaux and Finch /McCowan. Later in 1914, three more schools in Southwest Scarborough, Scarborough Village and Agincourt were built.

In need for secondary education, Agincourt Continuation School was established in 1915 in the elementary school building while senior grades were done in Markham District High School. However, by 1919, many students in south Scarborough had attended Malvern Collegiate Institute in East Toronto, which became a reality in 1922 when Scarboro High School opened its doors with classic specialist Dr. Reginald H. King as principal, three teachers and 116 pupils.

By the early 1940s the public school inspector for Scarborough, H. A. Halbert, initiated a movement to amalgamate these small school sections to form Township School Areas known as the Scarborough Township Public School Board, each with a Board of five Trustees, which would be better able to meet Scarborough's modern educational needs. Between 1944 and 1947, the township board was divided into three areas:

 Area 1: Southwest Scarborough (School sections 10, 12, 13, 15)
 Area 2: Central Scarborough (School sections 7, 8, 9, 16 – Area 6 joined in 1953)
 Area 3: North Scarborough (School sections 5 and 14)

Towards the end of 1953, there were 32 schools with 13,227 students and 356 teaching staff.

On January 1, 1954, The Collegiate and Township Boards merged into the new Scarborough Board of Education. Dr. King, the principal of Scarborough C.I. became the first Director of Education. As the architecture of these new schools was simple, functional and unpretentious, the earlier models were sometimes subject to criticism as bearing too close a resemblance to long, low factory buildings. However, as school succeeded school, their style and appearance was progressively improved. In some of the more recent buildings marks of beauty and distinction have begun to emerge. Indeed, to the eyes of older Scarborough residents accustomed to the bare little brick schoolhouses of the rural period, the latest modern school buildings of gleaming glass, steel, and brick are most impressive temples of learning. To attractive well-lighted classrooms have been added new features: beautiful kindergarten classrooms with radiant heating in the floors, libraries, manual training and household science rooms, rooms for nurses and teachers, spacious dual purpose gymnasiums and auditoriums with stages, and modern equipment such as motion picture projectors, tape recorders and even television sets. Many children are also transported daily to school in school buses; which ends the era of the day of the long walk to school in wind and rain, snow, mud and dust conditions.

With overcrowding at Scarborough Collegiate Institute and Agincourt High School, they were incapable of coping with the crowds of students seeking secondary education. This led to the construction of its third high school Winston Churchill Collegiate Institute, named after Winston Churchill, on Kennedy and Lawrence in the Dorset Park area on December 4, 1953, with the first 657 pupils admitted on September 7, 1954. One year later, West Hill Collegiate Institute on Morningside Avenue in West Hill opened on September 6, 1955, to 376 students. That year it was also necessary to enlarge Agincourt Collegiate Institute by the addition of seventeen rooms and a gymnasium.

Then followed in rapid succession the building of four more great secondary schools to meet the need for accommodation for 1,200 more students each year. In 1958, W. A. Porter Collegiate Institute –whose school named after the science master and assistant principal of Scarborough's first High School for many years from its opening in 1922 – was completed on Fairfax Crescent in the Clairlea district. To it was later added a notable new feature, an indoor swimming pool, the first of its kind in Scarborough. In 1959, the David and Mary Thomson Collegiate Institute, a 1,200 pupil school costing $1,728,400.00, was constructed on Lawrence Avenue a short distance west of the first settler's home in the forests of 1796.

Next in 1960, the SBE's most ambitious venture in secondary education, the huge Cedarbrae Secondary School, was built at a cost of over $3,500,000.00, on the hillside overlooking the site of Peter Secor's grist mill of 1830, on the west side of the Markham Road. Designed as a composite school, it offered a wide variety of courses, Arts and Science, Commercial, Technical and Trades; and it included well equipped vocational shops, gymnasiums, swimming pool, auditorium with professionally lighted and curtained stage, and numerous other modern school facilities. The school was opened in September 1961. However, its eighth composite secondary school, Midland Avenue Secondary School opened in 1962. Like Cedarbrae, the school was equipped with an auditorium with seats, large rounded circular cafeteria, triple gymnasium, swimming pool and several commercial and technical shops.

The combined enrollment of 11,470 students and a staff of 526 teachers in eight collegiate institutes and the construction of yet more schools was in progress. On Ellesmere and Markham the basic high steel framework and long brick walls of the great new Woburn Collegiate Institute were rising behind the little red brick schoolhouse of 1863, from whose belfry had rung the call to classes that took generations of pupils from the farms of School Section No.6. The new Woburn C.I. admitted its first students the next autumn; and on Midland Avenue and Lawrence, Bendale Vocational School, planned especially for the benefit of students who normally drop out of school before completing Grade 12 or even 10, was also opened in 1963. The next year, 1964, Birchmount Park Collegiate Institute, built on the ridge overlooking Birch Cliff – which was once the shore of Lake Iroquois in ancient glacial times – and is attached to Birchmount Stadium, and the Sir John A. Macdonald Collegiate Institute (formerly O'Sullivan Secondary) on Pharmacy Avenue north of Sheppard, were completed.

Above the great bluffs towering up from the lake at Guildwood Village, where land once sold for six York shillings or seventy-five cents an acre in 1803, the Board of Education acquired fourteen and one-fifth acres at a cost of $303,700 for another school, and there the building of the Sir Wilfrid Laurier Collegiate Institute was begun in the latter part of 1964. At the beginning of 1965, on Midland Avenue north of Eglinton, the walls of the Tabor Park Vocational School, named after one of Scarborough's early schoolmasters, were built up to the second story; and work on the new Wexford Collegiate Institute on Pharmacy Avenue north of Lawrence was well advanced. There were now 15,000 students enrolled in Scarborough's secondary schools, and 761 teachers on the staff.

The SBE in September 1968, found itself responsible for the education of about 78,000 students, enrolled in more than 100 elementary and secondary schools. Some schools were surrounded by as many as 10 and 12 portables, and the total number of such temporary classrooms in use was 257. But while called on to wrestle continually with the accommodation issue, a building programme which never quite catches up with the spiralling growth of the Borough, and a budget requiring a tax levy of nearly 40 million dollars, the Board of 1968 still finds time to escape from the rut of routine business and explore new ground. Under the far-sighted leadership of its chairman, Muriel A. Clarke, and the dynamic Director of Education, Anson S. Taylor, the Board introduced a concept of new tri-level system of together with a Secondary School on a common campus. One such campus is now in operation in the Bendale Secondary School area; and a yet more imaginatively conceived three-school community was under construction on the Stephen Leacock Collegiate Institute site on Birchmount Road north of Sheppard Avenue as well as Sir Oliver Mowat Collegiate Institute on Lawrence and Centennial in Rouge Park. Both schools were opened in 1970. Its keen interest in training for young people unable to progress academically beyond public school still continues; and another well equipped Vocational School, three and a half million dollar Maplewood Vocational School, was opened in 1968 despite a year delay on Galloway Road in West Hill. However, in 1966, Sir Robert L. Borden Secondary School opened its doors.

By the beginning of the 1970s, the Scarborough community began to develop. In 1973, L'Amoreaux Collegiate Institute, located near School Section No. 1, was built on Warden and Finch and designed by Raymond Moriyama. The school was built with a forum and cafetorium in place of the auditorium to save costs. By 1976, Albert Campbell Collegiate Institute was opened on Finch and McCowan. This was followed by the three-level Lester B. Pearson Collegiate Institute in 1978 in the Malvern district and its final collegiate Dr. Norman Bethune Collegiate Institute, on the Warden/Steeles area, was opened in 1979. Meanwhile, two more technical schools, Timothy Eaton Secondary School, named after Timothy Eaton was opened on Finch and Warden in 1971 and Sir William Osler Vocational School was opened on Huntingwood and Midland in Agincourt in 1975.

As of 1985, there were over 160 elementary schools and 25 secondary schools.

In the first of its kind in Scarborough, inspired by George S. Henry Academy, the SBE had converted R. H. King Collegiate Institute into R. H. King Academy in September 1989. The new academy functioned as a quasi-private school enrolling students from out of area and the school featured clinics, mentorships and mandatory school uniforms.

In 1992, the SBE and the Centennial College made a deal to establish an adult education centre, the Scarborough Career Planning Centre, at the Centennial College. In 1994 the entities agreed to establish the centre there beginning in the fall of that year.

Plans were made to conduct the Scarborough Alternative For Educating Troubled Youths (SAFETY) program in 1994. The program was designed for students with twenty-day suspensions, the maximum period possible, in the former Highbrook Senior Public School facility. Community protests put these plans on hold and were never materialized. Currently, the SAFETY program was later evolved into the TDSB's Caring and 'Safe School' programs.

On December 31, 1997, the SBE, as with the other school boards in Metro Toronto, was dissolved. The board was merged into the new Toronto District School Board the following year.

Organization
The Scarborough Board of Education, at its peak, had 14 elected trustees with three delegates from the Metropolitan Separate School Board as of 1985.

Following provincial legislation directing amalgamation of the Scaborough Board with the other boards making up the old Metro Toronto School Board (Toronto, North York, East York, Etobicoke and Scarborough) the last meeting of the SBE was held on November 27, 1997, chaired by Mrs. Gaye Dale, Trustee of Scarborough Ward 1 and chairman of the board.

Schools
Scarborough's schools were built from the 1940s to 1960s. Older 19th- and 20th-century school houses were demolished to make way for large buildings as the area grew.

On the north end of the city schools were built from the 1960s to 1980s.

At one time the board operated educational programs for Francophone students. The Conseil des écoles françaises de la communauté urbaine de Toronto (CEFCUT) assumed control of French-language education in the Toronto area on 1 December 1988.

Elementary schools

Junior Public Schools (and mixed)
From 1968 to 1980s, many existing Kindergarten to Grade 8 schools were redesignated as Junior Public School, targeting pupils ages 4 to 12 from kindergarten to grade 6 only.

Senior Public Schools
In 1967, the SBE introduced a concept known as "Senior Public School", which were middle schools serving children ages 12 to 14 from grades 7 and 8. To date, only 16 middle schools were built. The amenities each school had one double gymnasium (with or without stages), cafetoriums or cafeterias, science labs, lockers and shops.

The concept was abandoned in the 1980s and future schools were simply changed to K-8 schools instead.

Secondary schools

Collegiate institutes

Vocational schools
The SBE operated six vocational secondary schools that are not classified as regular collegiates. Three schools offered general and basic courses as Business and Technical Institute (formerly Secondary School) while the other three offered basic level courses in a special education level branded as High School (previously known as Vocational School).

Two facilities that have other unique features such as Bendale (swimming pool) and Tabor Park (child care).

Core holdings and leased schools

Three former SBE have been lease out:

 In 1989, the then Scarborough Board of Education leased Tabor Park Vocation School (High School) to the Metropolitan Separate School Board (now the Toronto Catholic District School Board) and now operates as St. Joan of Arc Catholic Academy.
 McCowan Road Junior Public School opened 1954 was closed in 2011 and is leased out to UMC High School. It was previously occupied by Wali Ur Asr Islamic School. 
 Gooderham Public School (1955–1999) is now Gooderham Adult Learning Centre via leased to the City of Toronto.

Directors of Education
 Reginald H. King (1896–1962) 1954–1960 <ref.Scarborough Archives>
 Anson S. Taylor (1918–2007) 1961–1977 <ref.Scarborough Archives>
 Bill Parish (1924–2018) 1977–1982 <ref.Scarborough Archives>
 Pat McLoughlin 1982–1986 <ref.Scarborough Archives>
 Cameron A. Cowan 1986–1992 <ref. Scarborough Archives>
 Earl G. Campbell 1992–1998 <Scarborough Archives>

Facilities
The board's administrative offices were located at 140 Borough Drive within the Scarborough Civic Centre. Buses and board vehicles were later stored on McLevin Avenue (McGriskin). The administrative offices remain in use today by the Toronto District School Board.

Until 1973, the board offices was also located at Scarborough Municipal Offices at 2100 Eglinton Avenue near Birchmount Road (built after World War II now demolished and site of parking lot). 
The new SBE administrative offices, located at 2466 Eglinton Avenue East (northside of Eglinton and west of Midland Avenue) and designed by architect Harold Carter, were built in 1954 and administrative operations were relocated in 1973. The former building was declared redundant by 1986 and was replaced by Rainbow Village condos in 1990.

The board operated a fleet of their own school buses, similar to the Toronto Board of Education and Board of Education of North York and were stored at 2466 Eglinton Avenue East site.

Hillside Outdoor Education Centre, formerly Hillside PS (SS No 4), was used for outdoor education programs and located near Rouge Park and still used as such by the TDSB.

References

External links
 Scarborough Board of Education (Archive)

Education in Scarborough, Toronto
Former school districts in Ontario
1954 establishments in Ontario
1998 disestablishments in Ontario
Toronto District School Board